Orchestra National de Jazz is a French jazz ensemble originally created at the initiation of Jack Lang, at that time Minister of Culture. Its first leader was François Jeanneau.

Members

ONJ François Jeanneau, 1986 
 François Jeanneau : soprano and tenor saxophone, director
 François Chassagnite, Michel Delakian, Christian Martinez, Éric Mula : trumpet, bugle
 Jean-Louis Damant, Denis Leloup, Yves Robert : trombone
 Didier Havet, tuba
 Éric Barret, Jean-Louis Chautemps, Richard Foy, Pierre-Olivier Govin : tenor and soprano saxophone
 Bruno Rousselet : bassoon, bass clarinet, bass saxophone
 Marc Ducret : guitar
 Andy Emler : piano électrique, synthesizer
 Denis Badault : piano acoustique, synthesizer
 Michel Benita : double-bass, electric bass
 Aaron Scott : drums
 François Verly : vibraphone, marimba, percussion

ONJ Antoine Hervé, 1987 to 1989 
 Antoine Hervé : piano, director
 André Ceccarelli, Mokhtar Samba : drums
 Pierre-Michel Balthazar, François Verly : percussion
 Jean-Marc Jafet, Étienne M'Bappé, François Moutin : double-bass, bass
 Philippe Guez : keyboards
 Nguyên Lê : guitar
 Patrice Petitdidier : french horn
 Didier Havet : tuba
 Jacques Bolognesi, Bernard Camoin, Glenn Ferris, Denis Leloup, Gilles Salommez : trombones
 Michel Delakian, Antoine Illouz, Christian Martinez, Philippe Slominski : trumpet, bugle
 Francis Bourrec, Gilbert Dall'anese, Laurent Dehors, Pierre-Olivier Govin, Alain Hatot, Jean-Pierre Solves : saxophones

ONJ Claude Barthélémy, 1989 to 1991 
 Claude Barthélemy : director, guitar
 Manuel Denizet, Christian Lété : drums
 Renaud Garcia-Fons, Jean-Luc Ponthieux : double-bass, electric bass
 Serge Lazarevitch, Gérard Pansanel : guitar
 Jean-Louis Matinier : accordion
 Mico Nissim : piano
 Michel Godard : tuba
 Yves Favre, Luca Bonvini : trombone
 Jean-François Canape, Patrick Fabert : trumpet, bugle
 Michael Riessler, Bobby Rangell : saxophones

ONJ Denis Badault, 1991 to 1994 
 Denis Badault : director, piano
 François Laizeau : drums
 Xavier Desandre Navarre :percussion
 Heiri Kaenzig, Bob Harrison : double-bass, electric bass
 Lionel Benhamou : guitar
 Laurent Hoevenaers : cello
 Nedim Nalbantoglu : violin
 Didier Havet : tuba
 Jean-Louis Pommier, Geoffroy de Masure : trombone
 Claude Égéa, Claus Stötter : trumpet, bugle
 Rémi Biet, Laurent Blumenthal, Philippe Sellam, Simon Spang-Hanssen : saxophones
 Élise Caron : vocals

ONJ Laurent Cugny, 1994 to 1997 
 Laurent Cugny : director, piano
 Stéphane Huchard : drums
 Frédéric Monino : electric bass
 Lionel Benhamou, Frédéric Favarel : guitar
 Benoît de Mesmay : keyboards
 Bernard François, Jacques Peillon : french horn
 Philippe Legris, Christian Laisné : tuba
 Phil Abraham : trombone
 Claude Égéa, Serge Plume, Claus Stötter, Pierre Drevet, Flavio Boltro : trumpet, bugle
 Stefano Di Battista, Boris Blanchet, Pierre-Olivier Govin, Stéphane Guillaume : saxophones
 Denis Barbier : flute

ONJ  Didier Levallet, 1997 to 2000 
 Didier Levallet, director, double-bass
 Harry Beckett, Michel Feugère, Nicolas Folmer : trumpet, bugle
 Lionel Surin : french horn
 Phil Abraham, Yves Robert : trombone
 Chris Biscoe : alto saxophone, alto clarinet
 Frédéric Couderc : tenor and soprano saxophone, clarinet
 Jean-Rémy Guédon, tenor saxophone
 Richard Foy, baritone saxophone, bass clarinet
 Serge Lazarevitch, guitar
 Sophia Domancich, piano
 François Laizeau,  : drums

ONJ Paolo Damiani, 2000 to 2002 
 Paolo Damiani : director, cello
 Christophe Marguet : drums
  : double-bass
 Olivier Benoit, Manu Codjia : guitar
 Régis Huby : violin
 Didier Havet : tuba
 Gianluca Petrella, Guéorgui Kornazov : trombone
 Médéric Collignon, Alain Vankenhove : trumpet, bugle, cornet
 François Jeanneau, Javier Girotto, Christophe Monniot, Thomas de Pourquery, Jean-Marc Larché : saxophones
 Laure Donnat : vocals

ONJ Claude Barthélemy, 2002 to 2005 
 Claude Barthélemy - director, guitar, oud, composition
 Jean-Luc Landsweerdt - drums
 Vincent Limouzin - vibraphone, marimba
 Nicolas Mahieux - double-bass
 Olivier Lété - electric bass
 Didier Ithursarry - accordion
 Alexis Thérain - guitar
 Sébastien Llado - trombone
 Jean-Louis Pommier - trombone
 Pascal Benech - trombone bass
 Médéric Collignon – pocket cornet
 Geoffroy Tamisier - trumpet, bugle
 Vincent Mascart - saxophones
 Philippe Lemoine - saxophones

ONJ Franck Tortiller, 2005 to 2008 
Permanent :
 Franck Tortiller-: director, vibraphone, composition
 Vincent Limouzin - vibraphone, marimba
 Patrice Héral - drums, voix
 David Pouradier-Duteil - drums
 Yves Torchinsky - double-bass
 Jean Gobinet - trumpet, bugle
 Éric Séva - saxophones
 Jean-Louis Pommier - trombone
 Michel Marre - tuba
Programme Close to Heaven :
 Xavier Garcia - samples, electronics
Programme Sentimental 3/4 :
 Herbert Joos - trumpet, bugle
 Bruno Wilhelm - saxophones
 Éric Bijon - accordion
Programme Électrique :
Joël Chausse - trumpet, bugle
Claude Gomez - samples, electronics

ONJ Daniel Yvinec, 2009 to 2013 
 Daniel Yvinec- artistic director
 Ève Risser - piano, prepared piano, alto flute
 Vincent Lafont - keyboards, electronics
 Antonin-Tri Hoang - alto saxophone, clarinet
 Matthieu Metzger - saxophones, electronics
 Joce Mienniel - flutes, electronics
 Rémi Dumoulin - tenor saxophone, clarinet
 Guillaume Poncelet - trumpet, bugle, synthesizers (from 2009 to 2011)
 Sylvain Bardiau - trumpet, bugle, trombone (from 2011 to 2013)
 Pierre Perchaud - guitar, banjo
 Sylvain Daniel - electric bass
 Yoann Serra - drums

ONJ Olivier Benoit, 2014 to 2017 
 Olivier Benoit – artistic director, guitar, composition
 Bruno Chevillon – artistic counsel, double-bass, electric bass
 Jean Dousteyssier - clarinet, tenor saxophone
 Alexandra Grimal - tenor and soprano saxophone
 Hugues Mayot - saxophones, clarinet
 Fidel Fourneyron - trombone, tuba
 Fabrice Martinez - trumpet, bugle, saxhorn
 Théo Ceccaldi - violin, alto
 Sophie Agnel - piano, nOpianO/chordophone
 Paul Brousseau - keyboards
 Éric Échampard - drums

Discography 
1986 : ONJ 86, Label Bleu (ONJ François Jeanneau)
1987 : ONJ 87, Label Bleu (ONJ Antoine Hervé)
1989 : ONJ 88-89 African Dream, Label Bleu (ONJ Antoine Hervé)
1990 : Claire, Label Bleu (ONJ Claude Barthélemy)
1991 : Jack Line, Label Bleu (ONJ Claude Barthélemy)
1992 : À plus tard, Label Bleu (ONJ Denis Badaud)
1993 : Monk - Mingus - Ellington, Label Bleu (ONJ Denis Badault)
1994 : Bouquet final, Label Bleu (ONJ Denis Badault)
1996 : In Tempo, Verve Records (ONJ Laurent Cugny)
1996 : Reminiscing, Verve Records (ONJ Laurent Cugny)
1997 : Merci, Merci, Merci, Verve Records (ONJ Laurent Cugny)
1998 : ONJ Express, Evidence Records, (ONJ Didier Levallet)
1999 : Séquences, Evidence, (ONJ Didier Levallet)
2000 : Deep Feelings, Evidence - Frémeaux & Associés, (ONJ Didier Levallet)
2002 : Charméditerranéen, ECM Records (ONJ Paolo Damiani)
2003 : Admirabelamour, Label Bleu (ONJ Claude Barthélemy)
2004 : La fête de l'eau, Le Vocals du Monde (ONJ Claude Barthélemy)
2004 : L'ONJ traverse le Canada, DVD Frémeaux & Associés (ONJ Claude Barthélemy)
2005 : Close to Heaven, Le Vocals du Monde (ONJ Franck Tortiller)
2007 : Électrique, Le Vocals du Monde (ONJ Franck Tortiller)
2009 : Around Robert Wyatt, Bee Jazz (ONJ Daniel Yvinec)
2010 : Shut Up And Dance, Bee Jazz (ONJ Daniel Yvinec)
2012 : Piazzolla!, JazzVillage (ONJ Daniel Yvinec)
2014 : The Party, JazzVillage (ONJ Daniel Yvinec)
2014 : Europa Paris, ONJazz Records (ONJ Olivier Benoît)
2015 : Europa Berlin, ONJazz Records (ONJ Olivier Benoît)

External links

References 

French jazz ensembles
Musical groups established in 1986
Label Bleu artists
Verve Records artists